The Kerayong River is a river in Selangor and Kuala Lumpur, Malaysia. It runs from Taman Cheras and empties into the Klang River near the  Pantai Dalam Komuter station.

Rivers of Kuala Lumpur
Rivers of Malaysia